The 1951–52 Illinois Fighting Illini men’s basketball team represented the University of Illinois.

Regular season
The 1951-52 Fighting Illini men's basketball team had reached a level of national prominence that was only bettered by the 1914-15 national championship team.  Head coach Harry Combes had guided his team to a Big Ten championship, a third place finish in the 1952 NCAA Division I men's basketball tournament and a final AP ranking of No. 2 in the nation.  Combes was beginning to build a dynasty in Champaign with 3 Big Ten Championships and 3 third place finishes in the NCAA tournament in his first 5 years at the helm.  The 1951-52 season not only brought Illinois another Big Ten title, it also introduced John Kerr, a center from Tilden Tech in Chicago. He began his three-year reign as Illinois’ top scorer with a sophomore-record 357 points. The Illini recorded a 22-4 overall mark and went 12-2 in the conference. Once again, Illinois advanced to the national semifinals and ran into underdog St. John’s. The Redmen fought their way to a 61-59 victory in the NCAA’s first Final Four, in Seattle. Illinois took another third-place award home after beating Santa Clara, 67-64, behind 26 points by Kerr.  At the conclusion of the tournament, Kerr and James Bredar were named to the Final Four All-Tournament team. Subsequently, at the conclusion of the season, Rodney Fletcher was named a Consensus 1st team All-American.

The starting lineup for the season included captain Rodney Fletcher, James Bredar and Irving Bemoras at guard, Clive Follmer at the forward slot with Robert Peterson and, future hall of famer Johnny "Red" Kerr at the center position.  The team also included former University of Minnesota head coach Jim Dutcher.

Roster

Source

Schedule
												
Source																
												

|-
!colspan=12 style="background:#DF4E38; color:white;"| Non-Conference regular season

|-
!colspan=9 style="background:#DF4E38; color:#FFFFFF;"|Big Ten regular season

			

|-
!colspan=9 style="text-align: center; background:#DF4E38"|NCAA tournament

|-					

Bold Italic connotes conference game

Rankings

Player stats

Awards and honors
Rod Fletcher
Consensus 1st team All-American (1952)
Look Magazine 1st team All-American (1952)
Converse 1st team All-American (1952)
Helms 1st team All-American (1952)
Associated Press 2nd team All-American (1952)
United Press International 2nd team All-American (1952)
International News Service 2nd team All-American (1952)
Collier's Weekly 2nd team All-American (1952)
National Association of Basketball Coaches 2nd team All-American (1952)
Athletic Publications 2nd team All-American (1952)
Team Most Valuable Player 
Irv Bemoras
Converse Honorable Mention All-American (1952)
United Press International Honorable Mention All-American (1952)
Johnny Kerr
NCAA Final Four All-Tournament Team (1952)
Converse Honorable Mention All-American (1952)
United Press International Honorable Mention All-American (1952)
Associated Press Honorable Mention All-American (1952)
Jim Bredar
NCAA Final Four All-Tournament Team (1952)
United Press International Honorable Mention All-American (1952)
Converse Honorable Mention All-American (1952)
Bob Peterson
United Press International Honorable Mention All-American (1952)

Team players drafted into the NBA

Rankings

References

Illinois Fighting Illini
Illinois
Illinois Fighting Illini men's basketball seasons
NCAA Division I men's basketball tournament Final Four seasons
1951 in sports in Illinois
1952 in sports in Illinois